Frederick Lowenheim (August 8, 1869- November 14, 1929) was widely known for his front page magazine illustrations of the Country Gentleman and Woman's Home Companion.

Background
Lowenheim came to the United States around 1885.  He received training in Berlin and The Art Institute of Chicago. Lowenheim was a storybook illustrator whose work often depicted children in amusing situations.  He illustrated 15 magazine covers for The Country Gentleman  He maintained a studio in Manhattan but lived in New Rochelle, NY.  He worked for the George L Dyer Company.

Some of Lowenheim's storybook illustration were:
His Friend the Enemy by William Wallace Cook (featured six illustrations)
Molly and her Brothers by Mabel Earle
New Fortunes by Mabel Earle
The Motor Maid by Charles Norris and Alice Murial Williamson (with three color illustrations)

Some of Lowenheim's magazine cover illustrations were:
The Country Gentleman, July 1, 1922 (Children in costumes)
The Country Gentleman, July 29, 1922 (Lady in a Car)
The Country Gentleman, August 26, 1922 (Boys crossing fence)
The Country Gentleman, September 2, 1922 (Look Out, Vicious Bull)
The Country Gentleman, September 30, 1922 (Boy with apples caught on barbed wire)
The Country Gentleman, October 28, 1922 (Girl looking for future husband in mirror)
The Country Gentleman, November 25, 1922 (Turkey Chasing Boy in Indian
Costume)
The Country Gentleman, December 23, 1922 (Santa coming down the Chimney)
The Country Gentleman, December 30, 1922 (Baby with Seed Catalog 1923)
The Country Gentleman, February 10, 1922 (Cupid takes aim)
The Country Gentleman, March 17, 1923 (Going Planting)
The Country Gentleman, March 31, 1923 (Paris Fashions for Easter)
The Elks Magazine June 1, 1923
The Country Gentleman, June 9, 1923 (Pedal Car at Gas Pump)
The Country Gentleman, July 14, 1923 (Watering the Elephant)
The Country Gentleman, December 22, 1923 (Santa overhears Children)
The Country Gentleman, December 19, 1923 (Good Road Ahead)

Family

Lowenheim was the son of Adolph Aaron Loewenheim(1839-1901) and Ernestine Heymann Loewenheim(1836-1889).  His father, Adolph, was a Rabbi.  Lowenheim married Gertrude Rosenfield of Illinois.  They had one son, Frederick Adolph Lowenheim (1909-1980), who was an author and expert on electroplating.

Examples of Loweheim's work

See also
The Country Gentleman magazine covers at magazineart.org
Lowenheim illustrations at The FictionMags Index

References

External links

Frederick Lowenheim at AskArt.com

1870 births
1929 deaths
Artists from New Rochelle, New York
American magazine illustrators
German emigrants to the United States